Michael Glenn Houston (born November 14, 1971) is an American football coach who currently serves as head coach at East Carolina University. He previously won the 2016 FCS championship during his time as the head coach of James Madison. Houston has also served as the head coach of Lenoir–Rhyne and The Citadel.

Early life
Houston played as a tight end at Mars Hill, where he earned a degree in Biology in 1994.

Coaching career

Early coaching career
Houston began his coaching career that fall as defensive coordinator at Forbush High School in East Bend, North Carolina, where he remained for two seasons. He moved to the same position at T. C. Roberson High School in Asheville, North Carolina. After five seasons, he was elevated to the head coaching position. In his five years as head coach, he compiled a record of 42–18, including a 5–4 playoff record, and earned the 2002 and 2004 Asheville Citizen-Times Area Coach of the Year awards. In 2004, his team finished the regular season undefeated, falling in the state semifinals and winning the first conference championship in school history. He also served as an assistant coach for the North Carolina team in the 2005 Shrine Bowl, helping lead them to a victory over South Carolina's squad.

Brevard
In 2006, Houston moved to the college ranks, serving as defensive coordinator and associate head coach at Brevard in their first season of football in 56 years. The Tornados won two games while starting a roster entirely composed of true freshmen.

Lenoir–Rhyne
In 2007, Houston became defensive coordinator at Lenoir–Rhyne. In his final season as defensive coordinator, the Bears defense led the South Atlantic Conference in total defense and were fourth in the nation in rushing defense. He was named head coach prior to the 2011 season. In his first season, the Bears finished 7–3, shared the conference title, and earned Houston Coach of the Year honors. The next season, he led the Bears to the Division II playoffs and their first playoff win since 1962 and again earned Coach of the Year honors. In his third and final season, the Bears reached the national championship game, falling 43–28 to undefeated Northwest Missouri State. Houston again was named SAC Coach of the Year and drew interest from several larger programs, as the Bears set an NCAA all-division rushing record.

The Citadel
Houston was hired as the 24th head coach at The Citadel in January 2014. After a 5–7 opening season, he led the 2015 Bulldogs to their first conference championship since 1992, and only third in program history. They also made their first playoff appearance in 23 years. For his efforts, Houston was named Southern Conference Coach of the Year.

James Madison
On January 18, 2016, Houston was named as head coach of the Dukes football program. Houston had a successful tenure as head coach of the Dukes as he led them to three NCS Playoff appearances and two national title game appearances. In 2016 Houston guided the Dukes to a 14-1 record and the 2016 NCAA Division I FCS Football Championship following a 28-14 win over No. 13 Youngstown State. In 2017, Houston led JMU to a 14-1 record and an appearance in the national title game where the Dukes had their only loss of the season as they were beaten by North Dakota State 17-13.

East Carolina
Houston became the Pirates' 22nd head coach on December 4, 2018. Houston, along with his assembled coaching staff, were responsible for turning around an ECU football program with five consecutive losing seasons dating back to 2015. Houston led the Pirates to their first winning season in six years in 2021, finishing at a 7-5 record. Houston made his first FBS bowl game (Military Bowl) in 2021 against Boston College. Due to COVID-19 protocols, Boston College had to back out of the game so it became a no-contest. Houston and staff led the 2022 ECU football team to a 8-5 record and a victory in the Birmingham Bowl against Coastal Carolina University.

Head coaching record

College

References

External links
 East Carolina profile
 James Madison profile

1971 births
Living people
American football tight ends
East Carolina Pirates football coaches
Brevard Tornados football coaches
James Madison Dukes football coaches
Lenoir–Rhyne Bears football coaches
Mars Hill Lions football players
The Citadel Bulldogs football coaches
High school football coaches in North Carolina